Ecliptopera is a genus of moths in the family Geometridae.

Species

 Ecliptopera acalles (Prout, 1938)
 Ecliptopera albogilva Prout, 1931
 Ecliptopera angustaria (Leech, 1897)
 Ecliptopera atricolorata (Grote & Robinson, 1867)
 Ecliptopera benigna (Prout, 1914)
 Ecliptopera capitata (Herrich-Schäffer, 1839)
 Ecliptopera ctenoplia Prout, 1931
 Ecliptopera delecta (Butler, 1880)
 Ecliptopera dentifera (Moore, 1888)
 Ecliptopera dimita (Prout, 1938)
 Ecliptopera dissecta (Moore, 1887)
 Ecliptopera falsiloqua (Prout, 1938)
 Ecliptopera fastigiata (Püngeler, 1908)
 Ecliptopera fervidaria (Leech, 1897)
 Ecliptopera fulvidorsata (Warren, 1894)
 Ecliptopera fulvotincta (Hampson, 1895)
 Ecliptopera furva (Swinhoe, 1891)
 Ecliptopera furvoides (Thierry-Mieg, 1915)
 Ecliptopera haplocrossa (Prout, 1938)
 Ecliptopera leucoglyphica (Warren, 1898)
 Ecliptopera litterata (West, 1929)
 Ecliptopera lucrosa Prout, 1940
 Ecliptopera macarthuri (Prout, 1938)
 Ecliptopera mixtilineata (Hampson, 1895)
 Ecliptopera muscicolor Prout, 1931
 Ecliptopera oblongata (Guenee, 1858)
 Ecliptopera obscurata (Moore, 1868)
 Ecliptopera odontoplia Prout, 1935
 Ecliptopera phaula Prout, 1933
 Ecliptopera postpallida (Prout, 1938)
 Ecliptopera pryeri (Butler, 1878)
 Ecliptopera recordans Prout, 1940
 Ecliptopera rectilinea Warren, 1894
 Ecliptopera relata (Butler, 1880)
 Ecliptopera sagittatoides (Pagenstecher, 1900)
 Ecliptopera silaceata – small phoenix (Denis & Schiffermüller, 1775)
 Ecliptopera subapicalis (Hampson, 1891)
 Ecliptopera subfalcata (Warren, 1893)
 Ecliptopera subnubila Prout, 1940
 Ecliptopera substituta (Walker, 1866)
 Ecliptopera thalycra Prout, 1928
 Ecliptopera triangulifera (Moore, 1888)
 Ecliptopera umbrosaria (Motschulsky, [1861])
 Ecliptopera zaes Prout, 1932
 Ecliptopera zophera Prout, 1931

References
 Ecliptoptera at Markku Savela's Lepidoptera and Some Other Life Forms
 Natural History Museum Lepidoptera genus database

Cidariini